Albert Hasibuan (25 March 1939 – 1 September 2022) was an Indonesian politician. He served on the People's Representative Council from 1977 to 1997.

Hasibuan died in Jakarta on 1 September 2022, at the age of 83.

References

1939 births
2022 deaths
Indonesian lawyers
Indonesian politicians
People from Bandung
Waseda University alumni
Gadjah Mada University alumni
Members of the People's Representative Council, 1977
Members of the People's Representative Council, 1982
Members of the People's Representative Council, 1987
Members of the People's Representative Council, 1992